The 1998 Sybase Open was a men's tennis tournament played on indoor hard courts at the San Jose Arena in San Jose, California in the United States and was part of the ATP World Series of the 1998 ATP Tour. It was the 110th edition of the tournament ran from February 9 through February 15, 1998. Unseeded wildcard-entry Andre Agassi won the singles title.

Finals

Singles

 Andre Agassi defeated  Pete Sampras 6–2, 6–4 
 It was Agassi's first title of the year and the 35th of his career.

Doubles

 Mark Woodforde /  Todd Woodbridge defeated  Nelson Aerts /  André Sá 6–1, 7–5
 It was Woodforde's second title of the year and the 54th of his career. It was Woodbridge's second title of the year and the 53rd of his career.

See also
 Agassi–Sampras rivalry

References

External links
 ITF tournament edition details

Sybase Open
SAP Open
Sybase Open
Sybase Open
Sybase Open